2Cal, formerly known as Two California Plaza, is a  skyscraper in the Bunker Hill District of downtown Los Angeles, California. The tower is part of the California Plaza project, consisting of two unique skyscrapers, One California Plaza and Two California Plaza. The Plaza is also home to the Los Angeles Museum of Contemporary Art (MoCA), Colburn School of Performing Arts, the Los Angeles Omni Hotel, and a  water court.

History
Completed in 1992 by Hathaway Dinwiddie Construction Company, Two California Plaza has  of office space. The towers were designed by Arthur Erickson Architects and named BOMA Building of the Year in 1997 and 2001.

California Plaza was a ten-year,  project. Started in 1983, the Two California Plaza tower was completed in 1992 during a significant slump in the downtown Los Angeles real estate market. The tower opened with only 30 percent of its space leased and overall vacancy rates in downtown office space neared 25 percent. It was nearly 10 years before significant tall buildings were completed again in downtown Los Angeles.

California Plaza was originally planned to include 3 high rise tower office buildings instead of the two completed. Three California Plaza at 65 floors, was planned for a site just north of 4th St., directly across Olive St. from California Plaza's first two office highrises and was planned to house the Metropolitan Water District's permanent headquarters.

The site is an entrance to the Pershing Square subway station.

In March 2012, the property went into receivership.

A tenant since 2000, Deloitte moved to the nearby Gas Company Tower in 2014.

In 2014, CIM Group acquired the building and made improvements to the restaurants and shops in the plaza which was popular but had been neglected. The California Plaza courtyard has an elaborate dancing-water fountain and the upper station of the funicular railway Angels Flight. The plaza also links to the Museum of Contemporary Art and an apartment tower.

Several clear shots of the tower under construction can be seen in the 1991 comedy/action film Harley Davidson and the Marlboro Man.

Tenants
 Reliance Steel & Aluminum Co.
 Munger, Tolles & Olson LLP
 City National Bank (California)
 Consulate-General of Japan, Los Angeles

Gallery

See also
 List of tallest buildings in Los Angeles
 List of tallest buildings in the United States

References

External links
 2Cal Official Website

Further reading

Arthur Erickson buildings
Skyscraper office buildings in Los Angeles
Office buildings completed in 1992
Bunker Hill, Los Angeles
Deloitte